Lensy Debboudt (born 20 September 1977) is a Belgian racing cyclist. She finished in second place in the Belgian National Road Race Championships in 2000.

References

External links

1977 births
Living people
Belgian female cyclists
People from Zottegem
Cyclists from East Flanders